Emil Minty (born 1972) is an Australian former child actor and jeweller.

Career
He played The Feral Kid, a feral child in the 1981 film Mad Max 2: The Road Warrior. As an actor, he had no lines in the film. After Mad Max 2, Minty had minor parts in Fluteman (1982) and in The Winds of Jarrah (1983). In 1990 he appeared in a few episodes of A Country Practice.

Personal life
Minty withdrew from acting when he finished school. He became a jeweler, and has worked at Chris Lewis Jewellers in Sydney's Gladesville since the early 1990s. He is a father of two.

In popular culture
In his novel Infinite Jest, David Foster Wallace named one of the primary characters at The Ennet House Drug and Alcohol Recovery House after Emil Minty.

Filmography
Mad Max 2: The Road Warrior (1981) - The Feral Kid
Fluteman (1982) - Toby
The Winds of Jarrah (1983) - Andy Marlow
The Flying Doctors (1990) - Mat Coulson

References

Bibliography
 Holmstrom, John. The Moving Picture Boy: An International Encyclopaedia from 1895 to 1995. Norwich, Michael Russell, 1996, p. 394.

External links

1972 births
Living people
Australian male child actors
Australian male film actors
Australian male television actors
Male actors from Sydney